Hannah Lux Davis (born May 17, 1986) is an American music video, commercial and film director. She's known for her work especially with female artists, such as Ariana Grande, Katy Perry, Demi Lovato, Nicki Minaj, Miley Cyrus, Avril Lavigne, Christina Aguilera, Hilary Duff and Fifth Harmony.

Biography
Davis was born and raised in Bellevue, Washington. In high school, she was diagnosed with exophoria, which hindered her ability to read and write. She left Seattle for Los Angeles at age 18, where she enrolled in the New York Film Academy, and the Los Angeles Film School a year later. For her final projects, she made music videos, and decided to pursue a career in the music video industry. Davis graduated from the Los Angeles Film School in 2006, and went into music video production. She worked for a time as a makeup artist after attending Cinema Makeup School in order to get on the sets of music videos, commercials, and feature films, and began making music videos in her spare time, paying the budgets out of her own pocket. The first video she was paid to direct was for Twin Atlantic in 2010. She has referenced Floria Sigismondi and Sophie Muller as two of her influences.

Filmography

Film

Music videos

Awards and honors

References

External links
Official Website

1986 births
Living people
American music video directors
Female music video directors
Los Angeles Film School alumni
New York Film Academy alumni
People from Bellevue, Washington